USNS 1st Lt. Baldomero Lopez (T-AK-3010) / (AK-3010), is the third ship of the  built in 1985. The ship is named after First lieutenant Baldomero López, a US Marine who was awarded the Medal of Honor during the Korean War.

Construction and commissioning 
The ship was laid down in March 1984 and launched in October 1985 at the Fore River Shipyard, Quincy, Massachusetts. Later acquired on 20 November 1985 by the Maritime Administration for operation by American Overseas Marine.

From 3 until 13 October 2004, Baldomero Lopez,  and  transported into the Port of Philadelphia 400,000 square feet of combat gear for U.S. forces deployed in Operation Iraqi Freedom. On 17 January 2006, the ship was purchased by the Military Sealift Command and put into the Prepositioning Program with Maritime Prepositioning Ship Squadron 2. The ship operates in the Far East and Indian Ocean.

During Exercise Trident Juncture 2018, she unloaded, inspected and transported supplies to designated areas on 12 October 2018.

Baldomero Lopez carried and unloaded equipments and supplies as part of Maritime Prepositioning Force Exercise (MPFEX) 2020 while off the coast of Florida at Naval Station Mayport, on 14 February 2020.

Awards 
 National Defense Service Medal

Gallery

References 

2nd Lt John P. Bobo-class dry cargo ship
Merchant ships of the United States
Bulk carriers of the United States Navy
Container ships of the United States Navy
1985 ships
Ships built in Quincy, Massachusetts
Gulf War ships of the United States